The World Games I baseball competition was held on July 27–30, 1981, at San Jose Municipal Stadium in San Jose, California.  The 1981 Games were the first World Games, an international quadrennial multi-sport event, and were held in California's Santa Clara Valley. Teams from the United States, Australia, South Korea and Panama participated.

Medalists

Standing

Details
Tuesday, July 28, 1981:

United States 9, Panama 1South Korea 10, Australia 0

Wednesday, July 29, 1981:

United States 11, Australia 7South Korea 7, Panama 6

Thursday, July 30, 1981:

Australia 6, Panama 5United States 4, South Korea 2

Other known individual participants:  PAN – R Dominguez, de Leon, Proveda

References

Baseball at the World Games
1981 in baseball
1981 World Games